This is a list of listed buildings in the Shetland Islands. The list is split out by parish.

 List of listed buildings in Bressay, Shetland Islands
 List of listed buildings in Delting, Shetland Islands
 List of listed buildings in Dunrossness, Shetland Islands
 List of listed buildings in Fetlar, Shetland Islands
 List of listed buildings in Lerwick, Shetland Islands
 List of listed buildings in Nesting, Shetland Islands
 List of listed buildings in Northmavine, Shetland Islands
 List of listed buildings in Sandsting, Shetland Islands
 List of listed buildings in Tingwall, Shetland Islands
 List of listed buildings in Unst, Shetland Islands
 List of listed buildings in Walls And Sandness, Shetland Islands
 List of listed buildings in Yell, Shetland Islands

Shetland Islands
Shetland-related lists